The 2015–16 Lega Pro Divisione Unica is the second season of the unified Lega Pro division. The championship name, which is Divisione Unica according to the FIGC regulations, is called Lega Pro in official documents.

Teams 

A total of 54 teams will contest the league. Clubs will include 2 sides relegated from the 2014–15 Serie B season, 43 sides playing the 2014–15 Lega Pro season, and 9 sides promoted from the 2014–15 Serie D season.

On 1 July 2015 60 teams mathematically qualified to the new season. However, Barletta (bankruptcy), Grosseto (bankruptcy), Monza (bankruptcy) and Castiglione did not submit their application for a license. New companies from Grosseto and Monza applied for Serie D, and Barletta for Eccellenza  while Castiglione plays in youth football only. Moreover, 12 teams failed the initial financial stress test of FIGC. On 17 July Reggina Calcio, A.S. Varese 1910, F.B.C. Unione Venezia, Real Vicenza and Paganese Calcio 1926 were officially excluded; new companies from Reggio Calabria, Varese and Venezia were admitted to Serie D and Eccellenza respectively, while Real Vicenza was focused on youth football. On 31 July Paganese won the appeal. The exclusion left Lega Pro 8 teams short as well as 1 team short in Serie B due to bankruptcy of Parma. FIGC decided that Brescia replaced Parma in Serie B as well as readmission of AlbinoLeffe and Pordenone to Lega Pro on 4 August. On 20 August Catania and Teramo were relegated to Lega Pro due to another chapter of betting scandal, while Savona was relegated to Serie D; Ascoli and Virtus Entella were promoted to replace the vacancies, subject to the appeals. Moreover, the Federal Council also reduced the league from 60 teams to 54 teams, making there was 2 vacancies left on 25 August. On 29 August Savona won the appeal to remain in the professional league; Torres and Vigor Lamezia were relegated, despite both FIGC, Catania and Teramo were still able to appeal in CONI. On 1 September Pro Patria and Messina were readmitted, while the last team promoted from Serie D was Monopoli.

Group A, North
 AlbinoLeffe, from Girone A
 Alessandria, from Girone A
 Bassano Virtus, from Girone A
 Cittadella, from Serie B
 Cremonese, from Girone A
 Cuneo, from Serie D, Group A
 FeralpiSalò, from Girone A
 Giana Erminio, from Girone A
 Lumezzane, from Girone A
 Mantova, from Girone A
 Padova, from Serie D, Group C
 Pavia, from Girone A
 Pordenone, from Girone A
 Pro Patria, from Girone A
 Pro Piacenza, from Girone B
 Reggiana, from Girone B
 Renate, from Girone A
 Südtirol, from Girone A

Group B, Central
 Ancona, from Girone B
 Arezzo, from Girone A
 Carrarese, from Girone B
 L'Aquila, from Girone B
 Lucchese, from Girone B
 Lupa Roma, from Girone C
 Maceratese, from Serie D, Group F
 Pisa, from Girone B
 Pistoiese, from Girone B
 Pontedera, from Girone B
 Prato, from Girone B
 Rimini, from Serie D, Group D
 Santarcangelo, from Girone B
 Savona, from Girone B
 Siena, from Serie D, Group E
 SPAL, from Girone B
 Teramo, from Girone B
 Tuttocuoio, from Girone B

Group C, South
 Akragas, from Serie D, Group I
 Benevento, from Girone C
 Casertana, from Girone C
 Catania, from Serie B
 Catanzaro, from Girone C
 Cosenza, from Girone C
 Fidelis Andria, from Serie D, Group H
 Foggia, from Girone C
 Ischia, from Girone C
 Juve Stabia, from Girone C
 Lecce, from Girone C
 Lupa Castelli Romani, from Serie D, Group G 
 Martina Franca, from Girone C
 Matera, from Girone C
 Melfi, from Girone C
 Messina, from Girone C
 Monopoli, from Serie D, Group H 
 Paganese, from Girone C

Stadia and locations
Note: Table lists in alphabetical order.

Group A (North)

Group B (North and Central)

Group C (South)

League tables

Group A (North)

Group B (North and Central)

Group C (South)

Promotion play-offs

Preliminary phase

Final phase
Semifinals on 22 and 29 May 2016, finals on 5 and 12 June 2016.

Pisa promoted to Serie B.

Relegation play-outs
Play-outs on 21 and 28 May 2016, loser on aggregate is relegated. If tied on aggregate, lower-placed team is relegated.

|}

References 

Serie C seasons
3
Italy